Novy Ashit (Yañı Äşit) is a rural locality (a village) in Kelteyevsky Selsoviet, Kaltasinsky District, Bashkortostan, Russia. The population was 58 as of 2010. There are 2 streets.

Geography 
Novy Ashit is located 16 km west of Kaltasy (the district's administrative centre) by road. Gareyevka is the nearest rural locality.

References 

Rural localities in Kaltasinsky District